Gnanam Balasubramanian, popularly known as Bombay Gnanam, is an Indian actress who appears in Tamil stage, television and film productions. She started her acting career as a stage artist in 1989 when she found Mahalakshmi Ladies Drama Group.

Career
She has acted in over 50 Tamil television serials including Premi, Kolangal and Chidhambara Ragasiyam',sahana, Ethirneechal. She was awarded Kalaimamani in 2005.

Filmography
 Avvai Shanmugi  (1996)
 Aahaa..!  (1997)
 Yai! Nee Romba Azhaga Irukke! (2002)
 Nala Damayanthi (2003)
 Oru Naal Oru Kanavu (2005)
 Veyil (2006)Azhagiya Tamil Magan (2007)
 Jigarthanda (2014)
 Endaro Mahavanubhavalu'' - 2018 (Also director)

References

Tamil television actresses
Actresses in Tamil cinema
Living people
Tamil theatre
Indian film actresses
Recipients of the Kalaimamani Award
Year of birth missing (living people)
Indian television actresses
20th-century Indian actresses
21st-century Indian actresses
Indian stage actresses